The February 9–10, 2010 North American blizzard was a winter and severe weather event that afflicted the Midwest, Mid-Atlantic and New England regions of the United States between February 9–11, 2010, affecting some of the same regions that had experienced a historic Nor'easter three days prior. This storm began as a classic "Alberta clipper", starting out in Canada and then moving southeast, and finally curving northeast while rapidly intensifying off the New Jersey coast, forming an eye. The National Weather Service, in an interview with The Baltimore Sun's weather reporter Frank Roylance, likened this storm to a Category 1 hurricane. Forecasters told  Roylance that "Winds topped 58 mph over part of the Chesapeake Bay, and 40 mph gusts were common across the region as the storm's center deepened and drifted slowly along the mid-Atlantic coast". This storm system, in conjunction with the first storm 3 days prior, has been nicknamed Snoverkill.

History
This storm appeared similar to the North American blizzard of 2005 because it redeveloped off the Atlantic coast and intensified into a powerful nor'easter. This storm began around Big Bend of Texas on the morning of the 8th. It moved northeast and reached the Tennessee Valley on the morning of the 9th. At 7 p.m. EST on the 9th, it was located near Charleston, South Carolina. It then moved north-northeast, near Norfolk, Virginia at 1 a.m. EST on the 10th, Georgetown, Delaware at 7 a.m. EST, Atlantic City, New Jersey at 10 a.m. EST, and just east of Seaside Heights, New Jersey at 4 p.m. EST. The low pressure system then drifted slowly east the rest of the afternoon into the overnight of the 10th.

Impact

Because this storm affected some of the same areas that already received historic snow totals from the February 5–6, 2010 North American blizzard, it only exacerbated the cleanup process, with cities still being paralyzed from the last storm. Numerous cities shattered their seasonal snowfall records as of February 11, including the following (more snow fell at each of these locations later that month):

There were also few places for city workers to put the plowed snow, since there are significant restrictions on dumping snow into bodies of water within most jurisdictions. Baltimore used empty parking lots, city parks, and the Pimlico Race Course.  It resorted to dumping the snow in the Inner Harbor after securing permission to do so from the Maryland Department of the Environment.

The National Weather Service issued blizzard warnings from Washington, D.C., to Long Island, including New York City, as well as the entire Philadelphia metro area and the entire states of Maryland, Delaware, and New Jersey. Winter storm warnings for heavy snowfall were posted from Illinois to Massachusetts, and the federal government was closed for the third day in a row (and was closed again the next day, February 11).  Many schools were closed, from those in the Washington, D.C. area, through Philadelphia, and into New York City (only the third snow day for New York City Public Schools since 2003).

A conference on consequences of global climate change sponsored by the Center for American Progress, the Global Implications of Climate Migration, scheduled for February 11 in Washington, DC, was postponed.

Connecticut 
Connecticut Governor M. Jodi Rell initiated an action plan with Hartford-area businesses and state offices for the staggered release of employees to avoid the risk of accidents and gridlock on snow-covered highways across the state. Heavy snow was responsible for numerous crashes, including one that closed Interstate 95 near the Rhode Island state line in North Stonington, Connecticut, and another on Interstate 395 near Plainfield. The snow also forced state and federal investigators to suspend their investigation of the Middletown power plant blast that occurred on February 7. The snow caused the cancellation of most flights into and out of Bradley International Airport, and Metro North operated trains on a reduced schedule on February 10.

Pennsylvania
Around the local Philadelphia area, snow began during the early evening on the 9th. As warmer air moved in aloft, the snow changed to sleet and freezing rain between 3 a.m. and 6 a.m. EST on the 10th. Surface temperatures responded slower and the sleet and freezing rain changed over to rain during the morning of the 10th. Some sleet mixed in from time to time. As the low pressure system moved northeast of the region, the rain changed back to snow by Noon EST on the 10th and fell heavy at times during the afternoon. Winds also increased and started to down snow laden tree limbs and trees. The snow ended late in the evening on the 10th. In the rest of Eastern Pennsylvania, snow began during the evening of the 9th and fell at its heaviest from the late morning into the afternoon of the 10th. The snow ended during the evening of the 10th, dumping between 11 and 27 inches of snow across the state.

On the morning of February 10, 2010, Governor Ed Rendell ordered the activation of over 11,000 Pennsylvania National Guard soldiers statewide, including nearly 500 which deployed in the Harrisburg area to assist state police with stranded motorists, to deny non-essential vehicles access to closed highways, and to provide blankets, food, water and other supplies to anyone who needed it.

Also, all Philadelphia public and parochial schools closed February 10, 11, and 12th due to the snow and dig out. In addition, many utility companies suffered their worst power outages of all time. For example, PECO Energy suffered its  9th highest power outage since the ice storm of January 1994. About 225,000 homes and businesses lost power. Outages by county were 60,500 in Chester, 55,000 in Delaware, 47,650 Bucks, 44,700 in Montgomery and 17,000 in Philadelphia. All power was restored by the 13th. The utility replaced 56 miles of cable, 50 transformers, 51 poles, replaced or reconnected 8,000 fuses, and 1,550 pole top cross arms. Damage to the infrastructure was estimated at 15 million dollars.

In Lancaster, two people died after the snowmobile they were riding on collided with a moving vehicle at an intersection. In Clearfield County, two pileups involving about 25 vehicles on snowy Interstate 80 left at least one man dead and 18 people injured.

Snowfall totals in the Pittsburgh area generally ranged between 5 and 9 inches, but high winds created near-blizzard conditions during the morning hours of February 10.  The new accumulations coupled with blowing and drifting snow exacerbated major problems created by the February 5–6, 2010 North American blizzard.  Accumulations in mountainous areas to the south and east of the city were over 1 foot.

Virginia
Near Williamsburg, Virginia, whiteout conditions around 9:00 am EST, February 10, led to a fifty-car pileup on a stretch of westbound I-64. The accident took hours to clear, and seven people suffered minor injuries requiring hospitalization.

New Jersey
Northeastern parts of the state experienced snow totals of up to 24 inches. Places such as Middlesex County northward experienced 18 to 24 inches of snow from the storm.  Many areas of Northern New Jersey experienced power outages. Some residents were left without power for days. The National Weather Service called a state of emergency. Blizzard conditions were a hazard for many across the Garden State Parkway and the New Jersey Turnpike.
Blizzard conditions were reported in major cities around New Jersey. With the "eye" off the shoreline, the entire state dealt with rain, ice and heavy snow inundate the areas. Schools were closed for up to 5 days, a rare scenario. Snow at times fell 1–3 inches every hour in South Jersey.

New Jersey was hard hit in many ways. Some suburbs reported thundersnow, which is the meteorological term for thunder and lightning in a snowstorm. Newark Liberty International Airport, Camden County Airport, LaGuardia and JFK Airports had more than 4 hour delays and some terminals were brought to a standstill. The winds were a factor with onshore winds reported to be as strong as 60 mph. The National Guard told people to stay off the roads for safety reasons. A wintry mix along with rainfall pounded the shore cities of New Jersey such as Atlantic City. I-95 southbound was icy and very hard travel because snow, sleet and rain fell at once. Visibility was also an issue for travelers as whiteout conditions were happening statewide. The New York Metro was busy other days but in the record breaking blizzard it was halted.

Rutgers University cancelled classes for the first time since the 2006 snowstorm on February 10.

Snowfall totals by state

See also
 February 5–6, 2010 North American blizzard
 February 25–27, 2010 North American blizzard
 March 2010 North American winter storm
 North American blizzard of 2009
 Winter storms of 2009-2010

References

External links

 "Blizzards add to snow chaos in north-eastern US", video report by BBC News
 "Snowmageddon II blankets Washington", video report by The Associated Press
 "Blizzard Pummels East Coast" , video report by NBC News
 "Washington gets hit with another winter wallop", photo gallery by The Washington Post
 "Picturing the Blizzard", interactive photo gallery by The New York Times
 "Timelaps NEXRAD Radar Animation", Atmospheric Physics group at UMBC

Blizzards in the United States
2010 meteorology
2010 natural disasters in the United States
Natural disasters in Washington, D.C.
2010 in Washington, D.C.
2009–10 North American winter
February 2010 events in the United States
Natural disasters in Maryland